Francis "Tanase" De Percin (born 8 October 1969) is a French professional football manager and former player who is an assistant coach at Ligue 2 club Amiens. As a player, he was a right-back.

Playing career 
A right-sided full-back, De Percin is a product of the Paris Saint-Germain Academy. He played for Paris Saint-Germain's reserve side in the Division 3 until 1992, when he left the club to join neighboring club Paris FC, also in the Division 3. After a season at the club, De Percin signed for Championnat National 3 side Tarbes. In 1996, he signed for FC Plateau Lannemezan, where he would play until his retirement in 2002. While playing for the senior team, he was the head of the club's youth academy.

Coaching career 
In 2002, following his retirement from his playing career, De Percin joined his former club Tarbes as head coach. He left after two seasons, joining FC Nestes as manager. De Percin made his return to Tarbes in 2005, although as a youth coach. In 2009, he returned to his former position of head coach at the club, a role he would be in for two seasons.

In 2011, De Percin joined Créteil as an assistant manager. In the 2014–15 season in Ligue 2, he briefly stepped up as manager, coaching the side for four games before returning to his role of assistant manager. In 2017, he endured another brief spell as caretaker manager of Créteil. De Percin left the club in 2018 to join Grenoble as an assistant coach, reuniting with his former Créteil manager Philippe Hinschberger. In 2021, he joined Amiens in the same type of position, following Hinschberger's path.

Personal life 
The godfather of De Percin's daughter is Jean-Luc Vasseur.

Honours

Player 
Paris Saint-Germain

 Coupe Gambardella runner-up: 1989

References 

1969 births
Living people
Footballers from Paris
French footballers
Black French sportspeople
Association football fullbacks

Paris Saint-Germain F.C. players
Paris FC players
Tarbes Pyrénées Football players
French Division 3 (1971–1993) players
Championnat National 3 players
French football managers
Association football coaches
Tarbes Pyrénées Football managers
US Créteil-Lusitanos non-playing staff
US Créteil-Lusitanos managers
Grenoble Foot 38 non-playing staff
Amiens SC non-playing staff
Championnat National 3 managers
Championnat National 2 managers
Ligue 2 managers
Championnat National managers